Tanya Rellstab Carreto (born 26 June 1978) is a Mexican politician affiliated with the PRI. She served as Deputy of the LXII Legislature of the Mexican Congress representing the State of Mexico, and previously served in the LVI Legislature of the Congress of the State of Mexico.

References

1978 births
Living people
Politicians from the State of Mexico
Women members of the Chamber of Deputies (Mexico)
Members of the Chamber of Deputies (Mexico)
Institutional Revolutionary Party politicians
21st-century Mexican politicians
21st-century Mexican women politicians
People from Tenancingo, State of Mexico
Autonomous University of Mexico State alumni
Members of the Congress of the State of Mexico
Deputies of the LXII Legislature of Mexico